Grip(s) or The Grip may refer to:

Common uses
 Grip (job), a job in the film industry
 Grip strength, a measure of hand strength

Music
 Grip (percussion), a method for holding a drum stick or mallet
 The Grip, a 1977 album by Arthur Blythe
 Grip, a 1996 album by Husking Bee
 The Grip, a 2011 EP by Cerebral Ballzy
 "Grip" (song), by Seeb and Bastille, 208
 "(Get A) Grip (On Yourself)", a 1977 song by the Stranglers
 "Grip!", a 2003 song by Every Little Thing from Many Pieces

Organizations 
 Grip Ltd., a Toronto, Canada, design firm, originally founded to publish Grip magazine
 Grip (magazine), an 1873–1894 satirical magazine
 Grip Digital, a Czech video game developer and publisher
 German Research Institute for Public Administration, Speyer, Rhineland Palatinate, Germany
 National Graduate Institute for Policy Studies, Minato, Tokyo, Japan

People
 Grip (rapper) (born 1989), rapper
 Jouko Grip (born 1949), Finnish Paralympic athlete
 Håvard Fjær Grip, Norwegian cybernetics engineer

Places
 Grip, Norway, an archipelago and deserted fishing village in Møre og Romsdal county
 Grip (municipality), an 1897–1964 municipality that included the archipelago
 Grip Lighthouse
 Grips-Theater, a youth theater in Berlin, Germany

Science and technology
 Grip (software), a CD-ripping software program
 Grip, a part of a scrollbar
 Battery grip, a camera accessory
 Cable grip, a component of cable car systems
 Pistol grip, the handle of a firearm, or a similar handle on a tool
 Glutamate receptor-interacting protein
 Greenland ice core project

Sports
 Grip (auto racing), the cornering performance of a race car
 Grip (badminton), how a badminton racket is held
 Grip (cricket bowling), how a cricket ball is held by a bowler
 Grip (gymnastics), a device worn on the hands of gymnasts
 Grip (sport fencing), the hilt of a fencing weapon
 Grip (sword), part of the hilt of a blade weapon
 Grip (tennis), how a tennis racket is held

Other uses
 Grip: Combat Racing, a racing video game
 Grip (raven), talking raven kept as a pet by Charles Dickens
 "Grip", a raven character in Charles Dickens' Barnaby Rudge
 The Grip (TV series), a 1994–1998 Irish children's sports programme
 Coordinated Regional Incident Management (Netherlands), an emergency management procedure in the Netherlands
 Governance for Railway Investment Projects, a system used by Network Rail to manage railway infrastructure projects

See also

Grippe (influenza)
Grippe (disambiguation)